The 1940 Boston Bees season was the 70th season of the franchise. The Bees finished seventh in the National League with a record of 65 wins and 87 losses.

Regular season

Season standings

Record vs. opponents

Notable transactions 
 May 8, 1940: Roy Weir was purchased from the Bees by the Philadelphia Athletics.
 June 15, 1940: Tony Cuccinello was traded by the Bees to the New York Giants for Manny Salvo and Al Glossop.

Roster

Player stats

Batting

Starters by position 
Note: Pos = Position; G = Games played; AB = At bats; H = Hits; Avg. = Batting average; HR = Home runs; RBI = Runs batted in

Other batters 
Note: G = Games played; AB = At bats; H = Hits; Avg. = Batting average; HR = Home runs; RBI = Runs batted in

Pitching

Starting pitchers 
Note: G = Games pitched; IP = Innings pitched; W = Wins; L = Losses; ERA = Earned run average; SO = Strikeouts

Other pitchers 
Note: G = Games pitched; IP = Innings pitched; W = Wins; L = Losses; ERA = Earned run average; SO = Strikeouts

Relief pitchers 
Note: G = Games pitched; W = Wins; L = Losses; SV = Saves; ERA = Earned run average; SO = Strikeouts

Farm system

Notes

References 
1940 Boston Bees season at Baseball Reference

Boston Bees seasons
Boston Bees
Boston Bees
1940s in Boston